is a 1956 Japanese film directed by Hiroshi Inagaki. It was entered into the 7th Berlin International Film Festival.

Cast
 Chishū Ryū as Shinji Mizusawa
 Kinuyo Tanaka as Otoku, housekeeper
 Daisuke Katō as Ishii
 Akira Kubo as Saburo Mizusawa
 Izumi Yukimura as Sueko Mizusawa
 Ren Yamamoto as Taro Mizusawa
 Kunio Otsuka as Jiro Mizusawa
 Gen Shimizu as Kitagawa
 Chieko Nakakita as Osaki, maidservant
 Haruko Togo as Shizue
 Minosuke Yamada as Shinji's brother
 Ren Imaizumi as Miyaguchi
 Fumito Matsuo as Mori
 Akira Tani as Hirotaka
 Yoshio Inaba as Detective of the special political police

References

External links

1956 films
1950s Japanese-language films
Japanese black-and-white films
Films directed by Hiroshi Inagaki
Films with screenplays by Ryuzo Kikushima
1950s Japanese films
Japanese drama films
1956 drama films